Peter Nicholson may refer to:
Peter Nicholson (architect) (1765–1844), British architect, mathematician and engineer
Peter Nicholson (cartoonist) (born 1946), Australian cartoonist, caricaturist and sculptor
Peter M. Nicholson (1919–1986), former political figure in Nova Scotia, Canada
Peter John Nicholson (born 1942), former political figure in Nova Scotia, Canada

See also
Peter White (Australian politician) (Peter Nicholson Duckett White, 1936–2005)
Peter Nichols (disambiguation)
Peter Nicholls (disambiguation)